François-Louis Perne, also known as François Perne (4 October 1772 – 26 May 1832), was a French composer and writer on music. He was known both for his writings on the history of music and also for being a director of the Paris Conservatoire.

Biography
François-Louis Perne was born in Paris. He started his musical training as a choirboy in the parish of Saint-Jacques-de-la-Boucherie. In 1792, he became a tenor in the chorus of the Opéra National de Paris, where he remained until 1799, when he became a contrabassist in the orchestra.

In 1811 he was appointed professor of harmony at the Paris Conservatoire as a successor to Charles Catel. He later became general inspector of the Conservatoire in 1816 and librarian in 1819. He died at Laon.

Selected works

Essays
 Cours élémentaire d'harmonie (1823)
 Ancienne musique des chansons du châtelain de Coucy mise en notation moderne (Paris, 1830)

Composition
 Fugue à trois partes, trois modes, quatre sujets et quatre faces (1800)
 Canon à sept parties et à nombreuses mutations

References

1772 births
1832 deaths
18th-century French composers
18th-century French musicologists
18th-century male musicians
19th-century French composers
19th-century French musicologists
19th-century male musicians
Academic staff of the Conservatoire de Paris
Directors of the Conservatoire de Paris
French musical theatre composers
Musicians from Paris
Writers about music
Writers from Paris